Michael O'Sullivan (March 4, 1934 – July 24, 1971) was an American actor, "larger than life," who appeared on Broadway, at Lincoln Center, on the London stage, at San Francisco's Actor's Workshop and in many regional theaters and festivals of America throughout his brief career in the late 1950s and '60s.

Clive Barnes of the New York Times designated O'Sullivan as "one of America's best young actors." Raised in Phoenix, Arizona, O'Sullivan studied and acted at the  University of Denver and the Goodman Memorial Theater in Chicago. He then played major roles (including a remarkable "prancing" Pandarus in Troilus and Cressida) at the Oregon Shakespeare Festival in 1957 and 1958.
 
He was one of the ten actor corps hired by the San Francisco Actor's Workshop under a 1960 Ford Foundation grant to the company. In 1963, he won the Obie and the Laura D'Annunzio Awards for his portrayal of the Director in Pirandello's Six Characters in Search of an Author, directed by William Ball, a role he also performed in London, and in 1965 he performed the title role in Ball's staging of Molière's Tartuffe for the new Repertory Company of Lincoln Center, prompting critic Howard Taubman to praise O'Sullivan for showing "how a Molière performance can be larger than life, and not out of focus... [moving] between cringing, shuffling humility and outrageous arrogance."

O'Sullivan was a nominee for the Tony award in 1966 for his role as the villain Sedgwick in the Broadway musical, It's a Bird, It's a Plane, It's Superman. His last New York appearance was in 1969 in Georges Feydeau's A Flea in Her Ear with the American Conservatory Theater at the ANTA Theater, and Clive Barnes said of that performance, "zany... galvanic lunacy... this is great farce acting."

In July 1971, Michael O'Sullivan was found dead in his San Francisco apartment at the age of 37, a bottle of sleeping pills by his side. It is not known whether his death was accidental or a suicide.

Partial list of roles
At the University of Denver
 Reverend Paris in The Crucible 
 Lighthouse Inspector in Thunder Rock
 Oedipus in Oedipus Rex
 Prometheus in Prometheus Bound
 Mephistopheles in Faust, (awarded "Best Actor of the Season")
The Goodman Memorial Theater, Chicago
 Beggar in Electra
 Prospector in The Madwoman of Chaillot
The Oregon Shakespeare Festival 1957
 Panthino in The Two Gentlemen of Verona
 Ceremon in Pericles
 Brabantio in Othello
 Cardinal Wolsey in Henry VIII
 Corin in As You Like It
The Oregon Shakespeare Festival 1958
 Pandarus in Troilus and Cressida
 Antonio in Much Ado About Nothing
 Old Gobbo in The Merchant of Venice
Actor's Workshop 1958–61
 Priam in Tiger at the Gates
 Nagg in Endgame
 Shanaar in Cock-a-Doodle Dandy
 Old Writer in Saint's Day
 Subtle in The Alchemist
 Patch Riley in A Touch of the Poet
 Grandfather in Twinkling of an Eye
 Lear in King Lear 
New York
 The Director in Six Characters in Search of an Audience, 1963, Martinique Theater (Obie and Lola D'Annunzio Winner)
 Thomas Jefferson, et al. in In White America, 1963 Sheridan Square Playhouse
 Tartuffe in Tartuffe, 1965, ANTA
Stanford University Repertory Company, 1966–67
(He appeared "in Shakespeare in San Diego")
 Six roles in repertory for Stanford Rep
New York return
 Sedgewick in It's a Bird, It's a Plane, It's Superman, 1966, Alvin Theater (Broadway debut; Tony Award nominee)
 Malvolio in Love at Let Love (Musical based onTwelfth Night), 1968
 Count Alexei in The Bench, by N. R. Teitel, 1968, Gramercy Arts Theater
 Camille Chandel in A Flea in Her Ear, 1969, American Conservatory Theater of San Francisco at ANTA, New York

Filmography

See also
List of unsolved deaths

References

External links

Michael O'Sullivan at Internet Off-Broadway Database

1934 births
1971 deaths
20th-century American male actors
Drug-related deaths in California
Unsolved deaths in the United States